Catoptria pyramidellus is a species of moth in the family Crambidae. It is found in France, Germany, Austria, Switzerland, Italy, Slovenia and Bulgaria.

References

Crambini
Moths of Europe
Moths described in 1832